Zebronia phenice is a moth in the family Crambidae. It was described by Stoll in 1782. It is found in Cameroon, Mayotte, the Democratic Republic of Congo, Equatorial Guinea, Ethiopia, Gabon, Ghana, Ivory Coast, Kenya, La Réunion, Madagascar, Mauritius, Mozambique, Nigeria, Senegal, Sierra Leone, South Africa, Tanzania, Gambia, Uganda, Zambia and Zimbabwe.

The larvae feed on Zizyphus mauritiana, Spathodea campanulata, Tecoma and Stenotaphrum species.

References

Moths described in 1782
Spilomelinae
Moths of Africa